is a Japanese anime television series produced by Sunrise's internal "Studio 7" and JVC. It is a spinoff of The King of Braves GaoGaiGar, produced under the direction of Yoshitomo Yonetani and writer Hiroshi Yamaguchi. It aired on TV Tokyo from April 1, 1999 to September 30, 1999, and was the first anime to broadcast in widescreen, though it was letterboxed.

Plot
The year is 2006, a series of seemingly random terrorist attacks rock the globe. Dubbed "Algernon", normal people suffer psychotic breaks and begin murdering everyone around them - often in profoundly disturbing fashion. In the wake of traditional law enforcement's failure to turn up any link between these incidents, a private contractor known as Akamatsu Industries is brought in to explore if Algernon is a disease, an unknown terrorist group, or even more exotic possibilities.

Meanwhile, a mysterious mass fatal accident occurred while preparing for the opening ceremony at the geofront type underground amusement park "Bottom the World". Asami Toko of the Algernon research institute "Modi Warp" who visited the investigation with the authorities, concluding that the accident was caused by Algernon. Around the same time, high school student Keita Aono accidentally stumbles inside the prototype Neuronoid Kakuseijin 01 in which is piloted by a girl named Hinoki Sai, his childhood friend he hasn't seen in years, and on board the cockpit as a rare "Dual Kind" head diver. In their exploration in the "Bottom the World" in hopes for them to escape, they both find out the mystery behind the Algernon phenomenon and the mysteries surrounding the mysterious man named Lamia who is classified as a "Betterman".

Shared continuity with The King of Braves GaoGaiGar
Betterman takes place in the same world as The King of Braves GaoGaiGar, predominantly before the events of The King of Braves GaoGaiGar FINAL, though only a few minor links are visually made within the series itself. The novel series King of Kings: GaoGaiGar VS Betterman fully explains the connection between two series and how both events overlap each other.

Characters

Protagonists
 - The main human protagonist of the series, whose point of view most of the story is seen from.  Keita is a seventeen-year-old high school student who, through a chance reunion with his childhood friend Hinoki, finds himself recruited as a Head Diver for Akamatsu Industries. He is quite different from the typical mecha pilot seen in most anime, being rather awkward and prone to panicking easily.  However, on multiple occasions, he shows his willingness to place himself in danger to protect those he cares about.  He has especially high readings as a Dual Kind, and at one point is even able to pilot a Neuronoid by himself.  This is a result of a transplant of dura mater he received as an infant, due to a serious head injury, from a woman named Laurier Noir.  Although he shows an attraction to several girls throughout the series, he is especially fond of Hinoki, and makes no secret of his desire to pursue a relationship with her, despite the rather apathetic attitude she often displays towards him.  .
 - The daughter of a famous paleontologist, who was orphaned when her parents and older brother vanished during an expedition to the Ajanta Caves in India four years before the start of the series.  She was recruited as a Head Diver by Akamatsu and Mode Warp shortly thereafter.  Hinoki acts in a sullen manner a majority of the time, and often derides her own intelligence when asked questions that she can not, or does not wish to, answer.  She is a childhood friend of Keita, but had not seen him in some time before their reunion in the first episode.  Although she usually acts uninterested in his romantic advances, she shows on several occasions that she cares more for him than she lets on.  She also refers to him affectionately as "Kei-chan".  She, like Keita, is seventeen when the series begins.  .
 - The founder and president of Akamatsu Industries.  His company worked with Mode Warp in developing the Neuronoids, and he actively assists in their attempt to eliminate Algernon.  He has an extremely inventive mind, and many of his company's products, which range from toys to military weapons, were his own ideas.  His dedication to his company, however, caused his wife to leave him some time earlier, which still bothers him on occasion.  
Sakura Akamatsu - Shigeru's fifteen-year-old daughter. She was born with the ability to tap into the "Limpid Channel", allowing her to pick up the waves of consciousness in the air around her.  By picking up the random thoughts of other beings, she is able to give useful, seemingly precognitive, information, though often in a cryptic manner.  However, she was also born with extremely poor health, and she spends much of her time confined in a special chair, known as a "Manage Machine".  Although she is a Dual Kind, she only is used as a Head Diver in emergency situations, due to her weak constitution.  .
 - A Bio-medical Engineer who works for Mode Warp.  She works closely with Akamatsu Industries in trying to understand and eliminate Algernon.  She was recruited by the mysterious "Director" to take part in the Dive Inspection several years earlier, and thus is familiar with several of the antagonists in the series.  She is killed shortly after learning that she, as a survivor of the Dive Inspection, is a carrier of Algernon.  .
 - A 24-year-old Head Diver, who is usually partnered with Kaede.  Although he often shows a collected personality in front of others, he suffers from psychological trauma from when his younger brother was killed in an accident while testing early Neuronoid models.  Seeing Keita reminds him of his brother, causing him to break down on several occasions.  He is a powerful hypnotist, and is able to hypnotize others merely by looking into their eyes.  He is devoted to his partner Kaede, and after announcing her pregnancy, marries her before the final battle.  He is tragically killed along with his new bride when she seemingly succumbs to Algernon and kills them both.  .
 - Shou's partner, and a powerful psychic.  Her dowsing abilities are a great asset in her role as a Head Diver.  She has a past connection with Mammon and the Superhuman Federation, and much of the latter part of the series deals with their attempts to harness her powers.  She marries Shou before the final battle, but seemingly contracts Algernon and kills both of them. Their unborn child somehow manages to survive and is rescued by one of the "lizard girls". .
 - The Betterman who the series in named for.  Lamia often shows up when the human protagonists are in danger, transforming into one of his fighting forms to save them.  He seems especially intent on saving Hinoki, whose brother he bears more than a passing resemblance to.  It is later explained that by eating the Vivele Fruit that grew from Hinoki's brother, he inherited his memories, as well as some of his physical attributes.  His ultimate goal is to defeat Kankel, the enemy to all life on Earth and protect Hinoki, whom he believes may also produce the revolutionary Vivele Fruit.  .
 - Lamia's constant companion, who usually takes the form of a large, yellow, moth-like creature.  She occasionally is seen in a larger, four-legged form as well.  In extreme situations, she takes the form of Betterman Lume by consuming pieces of the seed that came from Hinoki's mother, appearing as a glowing female figure.  .
 - Another Betterman who appears later in the series. He has a much darker skin tone and dresses in the raiments reminiscent of a monk. Like Lamia though, he has the tell tale characteristics of his species with red sclera, telepathic communication, and, of course, the ability to take on different fighting forms. He first appears to confront Lamia. Bodiju chastises the latter for twice breaking the taboo regarding Forte (Lamia transformed into Forte twice by then when his people regard the Forte Seed as weapon reserved for the use of a "leader"). He is also critical of Lamia's quest to protect Hinoki, thinking such efforts would be better spent in the fight against the force named Kankel. The confrontation turns into a battle between Lamia's Nebula form and Bodiju's Turba. The fight ends in a draw, but Bodiju confronts Lamia once more. After working together to survive a psychic's illusion, Bodiju agrees to assist Lamia and Seeme. The alliance is short lived as he is later slain by Kankel. Later on he psychically aides Lamia, bringing him the necessary components of the seed of Oltus (elaborating on his rivalry with Lamia by asking the latter if he can handle Oltus). 
 - A mysterious priest, rumoured to be over a hundred and twenty years old, who appears to offer aid to the protagonists at unexpected times.  Through his extreme physical and psychological training, he has managed to become the pinnacle of human ability.  As such, he was selected as the test subject of the Dive Inspection.  However, he vanished when the experiment went wrong.  Kankel was born from him as a result, and though he is connected to the creature, even Yakusugi can not keep it contained.  When Lamia destroys Kankel, Yakusugi dies along with it.  
 - A mysterious girl, though not having a large part in the series, she's one of the lizard girl experiments. She gained her own will and appears on a few occasions to save Keita.

Antagonists
- An employee of Akamatsu Industries, who attempts to kill his co-workers on several occasions after contracting Algernon.  He reprograms various types of machines and robots to attack his former friends, which results in the battles of the first several episodes.  After being apprehended, he is later killed and used to grow an Animus Flower by BPL.  
- The head scientist of BPL, who took part in the Dive Inspection several years ago.  Although his laboratory is said to be developing new food sources, he is actually developing various biological monsters, which he uses to attack Mode Warp and Akamatsu Industries' employees.  His biological creatures, which range from massive beasts to killer insects, are the primary threat of much of the first half of the series.  He is killed during the protagonists' attempt to attack his lab when one of his own creations, which has gained self will, turns on him. 
- A powerful psychic, and the leader of the Superhuman Federation.  His attempts to harness Kaede's powers are the main threat faced by the protagonists in the second half of the series.  Mamon is a survivor of the Dive Inspection who still hopes to create a superior human being through psychic powers.  He eventually does harness Kaede's powers long enough to transform himself into the powerful Brahman, though he still falls to Lamia during the final battle of the series. 
- A mysterious, incredibly powerful being, which appears as a somewhat effeminate, shadow-like creature.  It is the unexpected result of the Dive Inspection, made up entirely of cancerous cells.  As such, it seeks to consume all other life and assimilate it into itself, beginning with the Bettermen, which it recognizes as its biggest threat.  It is Lamia's ultimate goal to defeat this creature, which he manages to do only by transforming into the ultimate Betterman, OLTUS.
, the name of which itself derives from the book "Flowers for Algernon", is never completely understood until the final moments of the series. Even then, it is left to the viewer to deduce what Algernon exactly is. Algernon seems to be, as mentioned, either a virus, or a sort of mutation. Victims of Algernon show symptoms like those in the end chapters of "Flowers for Algernon," (loss of intellect and emotional control) but on a larger, more violent scale. Rage isn't the only symptom, as insanity and bodily mutation are evident in many cases.

Betterman's Transformations

Betterman NEBULA

Distinctly recognizable by its massive forearms which serve as highly resilient guards against enemy attacks. Nebula's form grants Lamia aerial capabilities and allows him to fly at high-velocity speeds. The signature ability of Nebula, Psycho Voice, first allows Lamia to analyze his opponent’s complete physical structure and to retaliate with a high-pitched voice attack which uses the same wavelength as his enemy's composition, thus eliminating it. This is the most frequently used transformation by Lamia and has shown itself to be the most versatile.

Betterman AQUA

In this form Betterman can inhale and analyze his opponent’s bodily liquids and attack with similar Psycho Fluid, breaking down the opponent's DNA structure.

Betterman TURBA

This orange form of Betterman uses compressed air and razor sharp wind as weapons. Turba's capability is Psycho Calm. In this attack, wind and sound are compressed into a small spherical area. This makes attacks such as Psycho Voice ineffective. The same organs can be used for jet propulsion. It should be also noted that this is a form that Betterman Lamia does not use. Instead it was used by Bodiju (he specifically chose it to counter Nebula).
faced with the truth

Betterman LUME

This bright yellow female form of Betterman uses electromagnetic radiation (electricity and various rays) as its weapons. Seeme transforms into this form by consuming pieces of the seed that came from Hinoki's mother.

Betterman FORTE

This is the strongest type of body that Betterman can obtain with common seeds. In this form Betterman greatly increases in height. Forte's method of defeating an opponent involves seeing an opponent's "breaking point" and using the Sliding Saber on his head to strike in this location (referred to as Psycho Glory). Opponents are then reduced to ash. It is also notable that Forte-type Betterman should be used only by "a leader," but Betterman Lamia has broken this rule more than once.

Betterman OLTUS

This the final and ultimate form which Lamia adopts in the final episode. Like "Forte," Betterman grows in size and gains a dark brown color opposing the white "Nebula." Using the ultimate power of "Psycho Burst," Betterman can regenerate his cells indefinitely; even if thrown into molten lava. Lamia gains the power of Oltus when his Master, friend, and his companion give him three seeds, which combine into one. After this, Lamia confronts the final enemy, "Bestman."

Glossary
Animus Flower A strange flower that grows from the heads of those who died while infected with Algernon.  The fruit that these flowers bear is what a Betterman consumes to transform. Animus as Jungian term means "true inner self," more precisely women's inner masculinity. Animus seeds in Betterman are physical methods of releasing one's inner self in various forms.
Best Man Project A project, organized by a man known only as "Director", to create a perfect, immortal human.  Specialists from various fields were gathered for this project, which culminated in the Dive Inspection.  After the experiment's failure, the survivors of the project split up, creating various organizations to continue the pursuit of human perfection on their own.  Mode Warp, BPL, and the Superhuman Federation were all founded in this manner.
BPL One of the spinoffs of the Best Man Project, founded and headed by Prof. Umezaki.  Although its original intent was to create new food sources, it wound up only creating biological horrors.
Dive Inspection The ultimate goal of the Best Man Project, where scientists and other experts attempted to create a perfect, immortal human.  Using Priest Yakusugi as a test subject, they attempted to rewrite his DNA to cause his cells to reproduce infinitely, effectively making him immortal.  However, something went wrong during the experiment, and many people present were killed.  Unknown to the participants, their experiment resulted in the creation of the destructive being known as Kankel.
Dual Kind Individuals who can connect their minds to another using a special substance known as Linker Gel.  By combining their neural energy, two dual kind can create a large amount of power.  Aside from this, dual kind have no other special powers or abilities. It can be argued that Dual Kinds have limited access to the collective unconscious.
Head Diver Dual Kind that pilot Neuronoids.
Mode Warp One of the groups that splintered from the Best Man Project.  Mode Warp works closely with Akamatsu Industries in creating the Neuronoids and battling the threat of Algernon.  The only notable member of this group is Miyako Asami.
Neuronoid Robots jointly created by Akamatsu Industries and Mode Warp.  As the machine is powered by Linker Gel, two Dual Kind are required to pilot it.  Each Neuronoid has two forms: The "Accept Mode", which is equipped with a variety of sensors used for surveying and analysis, and the "Active Mode", used in combat situations.  A Neuronoid's most powerful ability is the Synapse Attack, where particles from the environment surrounding the machine are drawn in, and then unleashed in a powerful blast.  Due to the rate at which Linker Gel becomes unusable, the Neuronoids can only remain active for a short time, which is one of their major handicaps.  Neuronoids use living brain matter in their construction.  Although human brains were originally used in early models, the current Neuronoids piloted by the protagonists use the brains of primates and dolphins.
NEO New Environment Organization, parent company of Mode Warp.
Superhuman Federation One of the groups that splintered off from the Best Man Project, made up of individuals with psychic abilities.  Although they use their abilities for business purposes, their true goal is to continue the work of the Best Man Project, and create a superior being.  Bakuto Mammon, the leader of the organization, is especially interested in recruiting Kaede for this.

Releases
Betterman is composed of 26 episodes, first aired on TV Tokyo from April 1, 1999 to September 30, 1999. It was licensed and  released in the USA (on DVD) by Bandai Entertainment. The series was dubbed by Ocean Productions at their Blue Water studio in Calgary, Alberta. The dubbed English version from this DVD release has also aired on the US cable network G4TV (Known as TechTV at the time of its airing) during the "Anime Unleashed" rotation, premiering on December 30, 2002. Despite this exposure, it is still a fairly unknown series to American audiences. This is perhaps due to its plot, as it is generally considered quite difficult to understand. Also, many different terms are used that are never explained, but these terms are scientifically based and often require broader knowledge concerning biology and other sciences. Following the 2012 closure of Bandai Entertainment, Sunrise announced at Otakon 2013, that Sentai Filmworks has rescued Betterman, along with a handful of other former BEI titles.

References

External links
 

1999 anime television series debuts
Action anime and manga
Bandai Entertainment anime titles
Brave series
Dengeki Comics
Horror anime and manga
Mecha anime and manga
Odex
Sentai Filmworks
Sunrise (company)
TV Tokyo original programming
Television shows set in India